The 1964 Daytona 500, was a NASCAR Grand National Series event that was held on February 23, 1964, at Daytona International Speedway in Daytona Beach, Florida.

Race report
The race was won by Richard Petty driving a 1964 Plymouth. Petty drove his number 43 to victory in 3 hours and 14 minutes. There were three caution flags that slowed the race for 19 laps. The Chrysler teams debuted their brand-new 426 ci Chrysler Hemi engine in this race; NASCAR ordered the teams who had it to sandbag it during practice and qualifying due to their superiority. During the race itself, Richard Petty, who at the time was known best for his skill on short tracks, led 184 of the 200 laps (a Daytona 500 record that stands to this day) and Chrysler teams took four of the top five spots.

First Daytona 500 starts for Bobby Isaac, Doug Cooper, Johnny Rutherford, Jack Anderson, Jim Bray, and Neil Castles. Only Daytona 500 starts for Dave MacDonald, Jo Schlesser, Smokey Boutwell, Jim McElreath, Ronnie Chumley, Bobby Marshman, Joe Clark, Bill McMahan, and Jim Cook. Last Daytona 500 starts for Jimmy Pardue, Billy Wade, Dan Gurney, Larry Thomas, Ralph Earnhardt, Curtis Crider, Sal Tovella, Parnelli Jones, Fireball Roberts, and Elmo Henderson.

This was the first NASCAR race that had a purse of over $100,000.

Top 10 finishers

Timeline
Section reference:
 Start of race: Paul Goldsmith started the event with the first-place position.
 Lap 2: Richard Petty took over the lead from Paul Goldsmith.
 Lap 3: Bill McMahan could not handle his racing vehicle properly.
 Lap 7: Bobby Isaac took over the lead from Richard Petty.
 Lap 10: Richard Petty took over the lead from Bobby Isaac.
 Lap 13: Fireball Roberts' transmission stopped working in a safe manner.
 Lap 15: Bobby Johns managed to blow his engine while he was driving.
 Lap 17: Bobby Marshman managed to overheat his vehicle.
 Lap 21: Ronnie Chumley managed to overheat his engine.
 Lap 31: G.C. Spencer had to leave the race due to a faulty engine.
 Lap 40: A.J. Foyt took over the lead from Richard Petty.
 Lap 42: Paul Goldsmith took over the lead from A.J. Foyt.
 Lap 49: Fred Lorenzen managed to blow his engine.
 Lap 52: Richard Petty took over the lead from Paul Goldsmith.
 Lap 54: David Pearson's accident forced the yellow flag to appear, caution ended on lap 60.
 Lap 64: Buddy Baker managed to blow his engine.
 Lap 77: Parnelli Jones managed to blow his engine.
 Lap 107: Johnny Rutherford had a terminal crash.
 Lap 112: Johnny Rutherford and Ned Jarrett's accident on turn two caused a caution, which ended on lap 118.
 Lap 126: Jim McElreath had a terminal crash.
 Lap 130: Jim McElreath's accident created a caution which ended on lap 134.
 Lap 189: Bobby Isaac ran out of fuel while racing.
 Finish: Richard Petty was officially declared the winner of the event.

References

Daytona 500
Daytona 500
Daytona 500
NASCAR races at Daytona International Speedway